Honor Thy Mother may refer to:

 "Honour thy father and thy mother", one of the Biblical Ten Commandments

Film
 Honour Thy Mother, a 1928 German silent film
 Honour Your Mother, a 1951 Argentine film
 Honor Thy Mother (film), a 1992 television film about the murder of Lieth Von Stein

Television episodes
 "Honor Thy Mother" (7th Heaven), 2005
 "Honor Thy Mother" (Cheers), 1991
 "Honor Thy Mother" (For the People), 2002
 "Honor Thy Mother" (Franklin & Bash), 2014
 "Honor Thy Mother" (Roseanne), 1996

Other uses
 Honor Thy Mother, a 1997 Shi / Daredevil crossover comic book by Gary Cohn
 Honor Thy Mother, the theme of the 2016 McDonald's Gospelfest

See also
 Honor Thy Father (disambiguation)